Robert Baynes Armstrong (1785 – 15 January 1869) was a British Radical politician.

Armstrong was elected Radical MP for Lancaster at a 1848—caused by the unseating of Samuel Gregson due to bribery—and held the seat until 1853, when his win at the 1852 general election was too declared void due to corruption and bribery.

References

External links
 

Members of the Parliament of the United Kingdom for English constituencies
UK MPs 1847–1852
UK MPs 1852–1857
1785 births
1869 deaths